Cereus vargasianus is a species of columnar cactus found in Peru.

Description
Cereus vargasianus grows tree-shaped, is often branched and reaches heights of 7 to 8 meters. A short trunk is formed. The cylindrical, glaucous green shoots are divided into segments up to 50 centimeters long. There are four to five squashed, wavy ribs that are up to two inches high. The gray areoles on it are elongated. The nine to ten spread, strong thorns are brownish. They cannot always be differentiated into central and radial spines. The three to four central spines are 7 to 15 millimeters long. The radial spines reach a length of up to 1 centimeter.

The white flowers are 8 to 10 inches long. The up to 8 centimeters long yellow fruits are ellipsoid and contain a white pulp.

References

External links
 
 

vargasianus